Little Aston Golf Club is an 18 hole members golf club located within the Little Aston Park Private Estate in Sutton Coldfield, England which has hosted a variety of leading professional and amateur tournaments including the Schweppes PGA Close Championship and the Brabazon Trophy.

History
Little Aston Golf Club was founded in 1908 when Harry Vardon was commissioned to covert 136 acres of land into the golf course, the design commissioned by Harry Vardon remains largely unchanged to date. The land had previously formed part of the estate of Little Aston Hall.

Little Aston hosted its first significant tournament when it hosted the English Amateur in 1927 and hosted its first professional tournament at the 1951 Dunlop Tournament. Subsequently the club has gone on to host the Schweppes PGA Close Championship the forerunner to the European Tour's flagship event in 1962 and the Brabazon Trophy on 3 occasions from 1970 to 1994.

In more recent years the course has been lengthened with addition of several new championship tees to continue to remain a competitive challenge in light of the changes in distances achieved by modern player and equipment.

Course and scorecard
There is a single 18 hole course at Little Aston Golf Course which takes the form of a parkland course, from the championship tees the course measures 6,813 yards.

All distances given in yards

Tournaments hosted

Boys Amateur Championship
Little Aston first hosted the Boys Amateur Championship in 1994 and subsequently hosted the matchplay tournament again in 2008 with the following results:

Brabazon Trophy
Little Aston hosted the Men's Open Amateur Stroke Play Championship for the Brabazon Trophy on 3 occasions between 1970 and 1994 with the following results:

British Ladies Amateur Golf Championship
The club hosted the British Ladies Amateur Golf Championship in 1998 with Kim Rostron of England beating Gwladys Nocera of France 4&3 in the final.

British Masters
The club has hosted the British Masters on 5 occasions between 1947 and 1969, for sponsorship reasons the tournament was known as the Dunlop Masters during this period and the results were:

Daks Tournament
Little Aston hosted the Daks Tournament on the European circuit in 1954 with Peter Alliss winning the event.

Dunlop Tournament
In 1951 Little Aston co-hosted the Dunlop Tournament with Sutton Coldfield Golf Club with Charlie Ward of South Africa winning the event.

English Amateur
The club has hosted the English Amateur on 4 occasions between 1927 and 2010 (co-hosting with Sutton Coldfield Golf Club in 2010), with the following results:

Jacques Léglise Trophy
Little Aston hosted the 1994 Jacques Léglise Trophy amateur boys' team golf competition between Great Britain & Ireland and the Continent of Europe, with Great Britain and Ireland winning 12½ – 2½.

Schweppes PGA Close Championship
In 1962 the club hosted the Schweppes PGA Close Championship which is now the European Tour flagship BMW PGA Championship, the winner was Peter Alliss with a score of 287.

Swallow-Penfold Tournament
Little Aston hosted the Swallow-Penfold Tournament in 1966 with Welsh golfer Dave Thomas winning the event.

See also
List of golf courses in the United Kingdom

References

External links

Golf clubs and courses in Staffordshire
Sports venues in Birmingham, West Midlands
1908 establishments in England
Sports venues completed in 1908
Golf clubs and courses designed by Harry Vardon